SMP Negeri 2 Sempor is a junior high school in Indonesia. Its address is at the village Kenteng RT. 01/04  Sempor District - Kebumen Region, Central Java, Indonesia. The school is located in a rural, mountainous region, more than 8 km from the capital district, Sempor, and more than 30 km from the capital, Kebumen .

History 
The school began operation in 1998. Then, it did not have its own building so the learning process was done during the day with a ride to the building SDN 1 Kenteng District of Sempor. Teachers when it comes from SMP Negeri 1 assuming that got additional duties of nine people, assisted by 2 Administrative staff with rombel amount of 2 (two) classes.

As of 1999/2000, State Junior High School 2 Sempor had four classes and its own building, but classes were still held past noon because the teachers had to travel from State Junior High School 1 Sempor. For the 2000/2001 school year, teaching and learning activities were able to begin at morning. At this point there was a Master Civil Affairs Officer, and as many as 12 people, 2 master variables, 1 staff administrative civil affairs officer, 2 variable staff officers and 4 school guards.

Today, State Junior High School 2 Sempor has 14 classes from three grade levels, with about 500 students, 35 teachers, and 9 staff.

To date, there have been six principals:

References

1998 establishments in Indonesia
Education in Central Java
Educational institutions established in 1998
Junior high schools in Indonesia